The 2018 Individual Speedway World Championship Grand Prix Qualification was a series of motorcycle speedway meetings that were used to determine the three riders that qualified for the 2018 Speedway Grand Prix. The series consisted of four qualifying rounds at Esbjerg, Žarnovica, Lonigo and Abensberg, two semi-finals at Olching and Terenzano and the Grand Prix Challenge at Togliatti. The three riders that qualified were Przemysław Pawlicki, Artem Laguta and Craig Cook.

Qualifying rounds

Semi-finals

Final

See also 
 2018 Speedway Grand Prix

References 

2017 in speedway
2018 Speedway Grand Prix
Speedway Grand Prix Qualifications